The 1991 Irish Masters was the seventeenth edition of the professional invitational snooker tournament, which took place from 2 to 7 April 1991. The tournament was played at Goffs in Kill, County Kildare, and featured twelve professional players.

Steve Davis won the title for the sixth time, beating John Parrott 9–5 in the final.

Main draw

References

Irish Masters
Irish Masters
Masters
Irish Masters